WBEW (89.5 FM) is a non-commercial educational (NCE), Class B1 public radio station at Chesterton in Northwest Indiana.  Since June 2007, the station has been branded Vocalo, initially airing listener submitted content and later airing an urban format. It is owned by Chicago Public Media and is a sister station to WBEZ in Chicago. WBEW broadcasts in the HD Radio format.

History
The station began broadcasting in early 2001, holding the call letters WAJW. It was owned by Auricle Communications. WAJW aired a Freeform radio format, largely simulcasting WFMU 91.1 in East Orange, New Jersey.

In November 2002, the station was purchased by Chicago Public Media for $550,000 and its call letters were changed to WBEW. Chicago Public Media simulcast 91.5 WBEZ on the station from November 2002 until June 2007.

Vocalo
The station split from its simulcast with WBEZ in June 2007 and was branded "Vocalo". Initially, Vocalo hosts played content that listeners had uploaded to the Vocalo.org website. It was launched with the desire to reach a more racially diverse and younger audience than NPR.

By August 2010, Vocalo had begun to base their playlist on hip-hop, dance, and R&B, and in 2014 adopted the slogan "Chicago's Urban Alternative". In January 2016, the Corporation for Public Broadcasting (CPB) gave Chicago Public Radio $450,000 to refine Vocalo's format, so that the format's viability in other markets could be researched.

References

External links
Vocalo.org, WBEW's official site
 

BEW
Radio stations established in 2001
2001 establishments in Indiana